Starr Insurance Companies (or Starr) is a marketing name for the operating insurance and travel assistance companies and subsidiaries of Starr International Company, Inc. and for the investment business of C. V. Starr & Co., Inc. and its subsidiaries. Starr is an insurance and investment organization with a presence on six continents; through its operating insurance companies, Starr provides property, casualty, and accident and health insurance products, as well as a range of specialty coverages, including aviation, marine, energy and excess casualty insurance. Starr’s insurance company subsidiaries — domiciled in the U.S., Bermuda, China, Hong Kong, Singapore, U.K. and Malta — each have an A.M. Best rating of “A” (Excellent). Starr’s Lloyd’s syndicate has a S&P Global Ratings grade of “A+” (Strong). 

Cornelius Vander Starr established his first insurance company in Shanghai, China in 1919. Today, Starr is capable of writing in 128 countries on six continents.

Maurice R. Greenberg is the current Chairman and Chief Executive Officer of Starr. In 2005, Mr. Greenberg retired as Chairman and CEO of American International Group (AIG), a former Starr subsidiary, which became the first fully licensed foreign insurance company in China.

Starr owns Morefar Back O’Beyond, a private golf course located on 500 acres (2.0 km2) in both Danbury, Connecticut and Southeast, New York.

References

External links
 

Life insurance companies of the United States
Reinsurance companies

Financial services companies based in New York City
Holding companies based in New York City
Insurance companies based in New York City
Multinational companies based in New York City

American companies established in 1919
Financial services companies established in 1919
Holding companies established in 1919
Chinese companies established in 1919